Adriano Gerlin da Silva (born September 20, 1974), known as Adriano, is a Brazilian retired footballer who played as a striker.

He won the golden shoes of 1991 FIFA U-17 World Championship, and the golden ball at the 1993 FIFA World Youth Championship.

Club career

Pogon Szczecin

He was signed by Pogoń Szczecin on March 2, 2005, and returned to Brazil to join Bragantino on January 11, 2006.

But on July 20, 2006, he left for Atlético Nacional of Colombia.

On February 13, 2007, he signed a 4 months contract with CA Juventus of Campeonato Paulista/Série C.

Club statistics

Honours 
 São Paulo
 Copa Master de CONMEBOL
 Campeonato Paulista: 1998

Sport
 Campeonato Pernambucano: 2000
 Copa do Nordeste: 2000

 Brazil
 FIFA World Youth Championship: 1993

External links

  Brazilian FA Database.

1974 births
Living people
People from Dracena
Association football forwards
Brazilian expatriate footballers
Brazilian expatriate sportspeople in Colombia
Brazilian expatriate sportspeople in Japan
Brazilian expatriate sportspeople in Poland
Brazilian expatriate sportspeople in Switzerland
Expatriate footballers in Poland
Brazilian footballers
Campeonato Brasileiro Série A players
Campeonato Brasileiro Série B players
J1 League players
Categoría Primera A players
Swiss Super League players
Brazil under-20 international footballers
Brazil youth international footballers
Guarani FC players
Neuchâtel Xamax FCS players
Botafogo de Futebol e Regatas players
Esporte Clube Juventude players
São Paulo FC players
Clube Náutico Capibaribe players
Clube Atlético Mineiro players
Sport Club do Recife players
Urawa Red Diamonds players
Esporte Clube Bahia players
Associação Atlética Portuguesa (Santos) players
Pogoń Szczecin players
Clube Atlético Bragantino players
Clube de Regatas Brasil players
Atlético Nacional footballers
Clube Atlético Juventus players
Footballers from São Paulo (state)